Jason Dean Akermanis (born 24 February 1977) is a former professional Australian rules football player who played in the Australian Football League (AFL). He is a Brownlow Medallist and triple premiership player who played for the Brisbane Bears, Brisbane Lions and Western Bulldogs.

Early life
Akermanis was born in Mildura, Victoria to a Canadian father John Akermanis, and an Australian mother Shona Carswell, but moved to Brisbane at 9 years of age. Upon arriving in Queensland in 1986, Akermanis signed up to play for the Mayne under-10s side.

When he was 13, Akermanis discovered that he was not the son of his mother's former partner, John Akermanis. His biological father was Denis Dezdjek, a mechanic from Mildura who his mother had an affair with. He was educated at Wavell State High School then at St. Joseph's Nudgee College and played football with the Mayne Football Club in the QAFL where he was spotted by Brisbane Bears talent scouts. He completed year 12 at high school in 1995, during his first year with the Brisbane Bears.

AFL career

Brisbane Bears (1995–1996)
Akermanis was a solid contributor to the Brisbane Bears midfield (wing), with his pace and skills evident even early in his career.

Akermanis made his debut in Round 4 of the 1995 AFL season, he had a solid debut, accumulating 19 disposals and kicking 1 goal in the Bears loss to Carlton. He played a total of 17 games in this debut season and kicking 12 goals.

The 1996 AFL season saw Akermanis play 21 games and kick 32 goals for the season, he doubled his disposal count from the previous season to finish with 328 total disposals for the season. His season was highlighted with a 19 disposal & 6 goal effort against the West Coast Eagles in Round 17.

Brisbane Lions (1997–2006)
It was after the Brisbane Lions formed that he began to shine, bulking up significantly, and a move to the forward line enabled him to make the most of his opportunities and develop a reputation as a goal sneak.
Akermanis played 34 games across the 1997-98 seasons and tallied 532 disposals and 32 goals.

1999 AFL season saw Akermanis have a breakout year, winning the Merrett–Murray Medal as Brisbane's Best & Fairest player for the season. Jason gathered 469 disposals and booted 16 goals for the season.

Akermanis became one of the Brisbane Lions' most talented players. His flamboyant talents and bleached-blond hair and contrasting black beard make him easy to identify on the field. At the Lions he made his name as a speedy midfielder or on-baller with blistering acceleration and an uncanny ability to kick exceptionally well with either foot, talents which helped him win the AFL's Brownlow Medal in 2001 in which he polled 23 votes to beat Adelaide's Andrew McLeod. The 2001 season saw Jason tally 510 disposals and kick 28 goals for the season, ultimately capping off a magnificent week/season, finishing as a premiership player.

The 2002 AFL season saw Akermanis impact the scoreboard by kicking 49 goals for the season, and becoming a premiership player again, as the Brisbane Lions defeated Collingwood in the decider. Akermanis played with a torn right adductor, in which he suffered early in the first quarter, this effected his ability to kick with his dominant right foot, resulting in Jason kicking on his left foot for the majority of the game, he eventually kicked a left foot snap over his shoulder late in the last quarter in which would be the sealer, guiding the Lions to victory.

Akermanis is also known for his goal-scoring abilities. He was a winner of the AFL Goal of the Year 2002 award and had an ability to kick goals from acute angles. In a match in 2005, he kicked two goals within minutes of each other from almost exactly the same spot: deep in the right forward pocket on the run. Early in the 2006 season, Akermanis was dropped from the Brisbane Lions side for Round 7, playing a game with the Suncoast Lions. This coincided with inflammatory comments that he made about the coach, Leigh Matthews, during the week, and there was speculation that his time at the club was up only a few months after he had won the 2005 club best and fairest award. However, Akermanis was soon recalled to the side and responded with 22 disposals across half-back in the game against Port Adelaide, and a post-match interview with Channel Nine showed him smiling and visibly happy with his performance. On 27 July 2006 it was reported that the coaching panel and senior playing group had voted unanimously (12–0) to not allow him back into the club.

Western Bulldogs (2007–2010)
On 6 September, it was reported that the Western Bulldogs were leading in the race to sign Akermanis for the 2007 season. On 15 September, Akermanis confirmed that he wanted to join the Bulldogs. It was then down to the Lions agreeing on the trade price, which they did on 9 October, when Brisbane Lions football manager Graeme Allan announced that the team had agreed to trade Akermanis to the Bulldogs.

At the end of the 2008 season, Akermanis made a statement that he would retire at the end of 2009 when his three-year contract expired, however he displayed excellent form at the start of the 2009 season, and later retracted his earlier comment about retirement. Western Bulldogs coach Rodney Eade said he had not ruled out the possibility of extending Akermanis's contract depending on his performance for the rest of the season. He then signed with the Bulldogs for another year, hoping to play in a fourth premiership side. It is assumed his contract would be for substantially less pay than his previous deal, which is estimated at between $350,000 and $400,000 a year.

In July 2010 it was announced that the Western Bulldogs had terminated Akermanis' contract due to the club's judgement that the two were on different paths. At the time of his sacking, he was one of only two former Brisbane Bears players left in the AFL, with the other being Daniel Bradshaw. He and Bradshaw were also the last remaining members of the Brisbane Lions inaugural 1997 list.

Post-AFL playing career
Akermanis began playing with the Glenorchy Football Club in the Tasmanian State League in 2011 as well as playing a number of one-off games at various country clubs. In 2013, he became captain-coach of the North Albury Football Club in the Ovens & Murray Football League.

Controversy
Akermanis threatened to switch codes to rugby union in 2002 if Brisbane signed former Kangaroos Football Club star Wayne Carey, and leaked to the media that teammate Nigel Lappin had broken his ribs during the 2003 preliminary final against Sydney.

In 2007, Akermanis wrote a column about performance-enhancing drugs and his views on their presence in sport, which included comments that he believed a specific opposing player, whom he did not name, had been using the drugs based on how strong a runner the player was for his size. The Seven Network and Fairfax Media inferred and named the player as the West Coast Eagles' Michael Braun, damaging Braun's reputation and subjecting him to an investigation by the Australian Sports Anti-Doping Authority, which cleared him of wrongdoing. Braun was ultimately awarded defamation damages against Seven and Fairfax, and received an apology from Akermanis, who conceded that he had been referring to Braun, and admitted that he had been wrong.

In a May 2010 column, he wrote about homosexuality in sports, and expressed an opinion that he believed homosexual players should stay in the closet, as he did not believe football culture was at that time ready to fully accept them. Numerous people spoke out against his column, and the Western Bulldogs, who were worried about the negative publicity, suspended him for two matches for not having the column approved by the club before having it published. Akermanis would later be dismissed by the Western Bulldogs two months later, partly related to leaking confidential team information to the media as part of a media career which the Bulldogs believed was taking an undue amount of his focus.

In a radio interview shortly after the death of former Melbourne Football Club player and president Jim Stynes in 2012, Akermanis commented that Stynes was "a nasty man in his day", was treated as a "demi-god", and questioned his deservedness to receive a state funeral just two days after Stynes' death.

In October 2014, Akermanis was suspended for four matches as head coach of the North Albury Football Club after being found guilty of breaching the AFL Victoria cyber-bullying policy in regards to several umpires' decisions during the 2014 Ovens & Murray Football League season.

By 2019, Akermanis had reportedly been banned by three golf clubs for alleged cheating incidents. Akermanis denied the clubs’ claims.

Personal life
Akermanis is married to Megan Legge, a speech pathologist. They have three daughters. Akermanis learned Auslan to communicate with his wife's hearing-impaired parents. He also speaks Spanish.

Statistics

|- style="background-color: #EAEAEA"
! scope="row" style="text-align:center" | 1995
|style="text-align:center;"|
| 35 || 17 || 12 || 8 || 101 || 65 || 166 || 30 || 15 || 0.7 || 0.5 || 5.9 || 3.8 || 9.8 || 1.8 || 0.9
|-
! scope="row" style="text-align:center" | 1996
|style="text-align:center;"|
| 20 || 21 || 32 || 14 || 240 || 88 || 328 || 76 || 26 || 1.5 || 0.7 || 11.4 || 4.2 || 15.6 || 3.6 || 1.2
|- style="background:#eaeaea;"
! scope="row" style="text-align:center" | 1997
|style="text-align:center;"|Brisbane Lions
| 12 || 17 || 20 || 17 || 185 || 65 || 250 || 67 || 12 || 1.2 || 1.0 || 10.9 || 3.8 || 14.7 || 3.9 || 0.7
|-
! scope="row" style="text-align:center" | 1998
|style="text-align:center;"|
| 12 || 17 || 12 || 11 || 187 || 95 || 282 || 51 || 18 || 0.7 || 0.6 || 11.0 || 5.6 || 16.6 || 3.0 || 1.1
|- style="background:#eaeaea;"
! scope="row" style="text-align:center" | 1999
|style="text-align:center;"|
| 12 || 24 || 16 || 7 || 331 || 138 || 469 || 105 || 36 || 0.7 || 0.3 || 13.8 || 5.8 || 19.5 || 4.4 || 1.5
|-
! scope="row" style="text-align:center" | 2000
|style="text-align:center;"|
| 12 || 21 || 26 || 13 || 322 || 138 || 460 || 107 || 36 || 1.2 || 0.6 || 15.3 || 6.6 || 21.9 || 5.1 || 1.7
|- style="background:#eaeaea;"
! scope="row" style="text-align:center;" | 2001
|style="text-align:center;"|
| 12 || 24 || 28 || 20 || 332 || 178 || 510 || 103 || 60 || 1.2 || 0.8 || 13.8 || 7.4 || 21.3 || 4.3 || 2.5
|-
! scope="row" style="text-align:center;" | 2002
|style="text-align:center;"|
| 12 || 22 || 49 || 31 || 297 || 105 || 402 || 95 || 90 || 2.2 || 1.4 || 13.5 || 4.8 || 18.3 || 4.3 || 4.1
|-style="background:#eaeaea;"
! scope="row" style="text-align:center;" | 2003
|style="text-align:center;"|
| 12 || 25 || 28 || 32 || 350 || 102 || 452 || 99 || 84 || 1.1 || 1.3 || 14.0 || 4.1 || 18.1 || 4.0 || 3.4
|-
! scope="row" style="text-align:center" | 2004
|style="text-align:center;"|
| 12 || 25 || 44 || 32 || 390 || 107 || 497 || 110 || 63 || 1.8 || 1.3 || 15.6 || 4.3 || 19.9 || 4.4 || 2.5
|-style="background:#eaeaea;"
! scope="row" style="text-align:center" | 2005
|style="text-align:center;"|
| 12 || 21 || 25 || 22 || 295 || 146 || 441 || 71 || 90 || 1.2 || 1.0 || 14.0 || 7.0 || 21.0 || 3.4 || 4.3
|-
! scope="row" style="text-align:center" | 2006
|style="text-align:center;"|
| 12 || 14 || 15 || 16 || 194 || 66 || 260 || 78 || 40 || 1.1 || 1.1 || 13.9 || 4.7 || 18.6 || 5.6 || 2.9
|-style="background:#eaeaea;"
! scope="row" style="text-align:center" | 2007
|style="text-align:center;"|
| 21 || 19 || 20 || 17 || 219 || 80 || 299 || 91 || 50 || 1.1 || 0.9 || 11.5 || 4.2 || 15.7 || 4.8 || 2.6
|-
! scope="row" style="text-align:center" | 2008
|style="text-align:center;"|
| 21 || 25 || 49 || 28 || 297 || 132 || 429 || 142 || 41 || 2.0 || 1.1 || 11.9 || 5.3 || 17.2 || 5.7 || 1.6
|-style="background:#eaeaea;"
! scope="row" style="text-align:center" | 2009
|style="text-align:center;"|
| 21 || 24 || 43 || 35 || 282 || 189 || 471 || 124 || 86 || 1.8 || 1.5 || 11.8 || 7.9 || 19.6 || 5.2 || 3.6
|-
! scope="row" style="text-align:center" | 2010
|style="text-align:center;"|
| 21 || 9 || 2 || 7 || 79 || 73 || 152 || 44 || 27 || 0.2 || 0.8 || 8.8 || 8.1 || 16.9 || 4.9 || 3.0
|- class="sortbottom"
! colspan=3| Career
! 325
! 421
! 310
! 4101
! 1767
! 5868
! 1393
! 774
! 1.3
! 1.0
! 12.6
! 5.4
! 18.1
! 4.3
! 2.4
|}

Honours and achievements

Team
AFL Premiership (Brisbane): 2001, 2002, 2003
Individual
Brownlow Medal: 2001
Merrett–Murray Medal (Brisbane Lions Best & Fairest): 1999, 2005
All-Australian: 1999, 2001, 2002, 2004
Brisbane Lions Leading Goalkicker: 2004
Western Bulldogs Leading Goalkicker: 2009

References

External links

1977 births
Aberfeldie Football Club players
All-Australians (AFL)
Allies State of Origin players
Australian rules footballers from Queensland
Brisbane Bears players
Brisbane Lions players
Brisbane Lions Premiership players
Brownlow Medal winners
Glenorchy Football Club players
Living people
Merrett–Murray Medal winners
People from Mildura
Mayne Australian Football Club players
Western Bulldogs players
Australian Football Hall of Fame inductees
Australia international rules football team players
The Apprentice Australia candidates
People educated at St Joseph's College, Nudgee
Three-time VFL/AFL Premiership players
Australian people of Canadian descent
Sportspeople from Brisbane